The 2015 Asian Acrobatic Gymnastics Championships were the 9th edition of the Asian Acrobatic Gymnastics Championships, and were held in Linan, Xianyou, China from September 17 to September 19, 2015.

Medal summary

Senior

Junior

Medal table

Senior

Junior

References

External links
 Results

A
Asian Gymnastics Championships
International gymnastics competitions hosted by China
2015 in Chinese sport